(July 26, 1936 – July 2, 2012) was a Japanese volleyball player. He was a member of the Men's National Volleyball Team that claimed the bronze medal at the 1964 Summer Olympics in Tokyo, Japan. He later served as the head coach of the Men's National Team.

Koyama died on July 2, 2012 of esophageal cancer, aged 75.

References

External links
sports-reference

1936 births
2012 deaths
Japanese men's volleyball players
Japanese volleyball coaches
Olympic volleyball players of Japan
Olympic bronze medalists for Japan
Volleyball players at the 1964 Summer Olympics
Olympic medalists in volleyball
Deaths from cancer in Japan
Deaths from esophageal cancer
Asian Games medalists in volleyball
Volleyball players at the 1958 Asian Games
Volleyball players at the 1962 Asian Games
Medalists at the 1964 Summer Olympics
Medalists at the 1958 Asian Games
Medalists at the 1962 Asian Games
Asian Games gold medalists for Japan
20th-century Japanese people
21st-century Japanese people
People from Kagawa Prefecture
Sportspeople from Kagawa Prefecture